Cornwallis Island is an island  long, which lies  northeast of the east end of Elephant Island, in the South Shetland Islands. The name Cornwallis Island dates back to about 1821 and is now established in international usage.

See also 
 Composite Antarctic Gazetteer
 List of Antarctic islands south of 60° S
 Prince Charles Strait
 Scientific Committee on Antarctic Research
 Territorial claims in Antarctica

References
 

Islands of the South Shetland Islands
Uninhabited islands